The eighth season of the American animated television series SpongeBob SquarePants, created by former marine biologist and animator Stephen Hillenburg, originally aired on Nickelodeon in the United States from March 26, 2011, to December 6, 2012, and contained 26 half-hour episodes, with a miniseries titled SpongeBob's Runaway Roadtrip. The series chronicles the exploits and adventures of the title character and his various friends in the fictional underwater city of Bikini Bottom. The season was executive produced by series creator Hillenburg and writer Paul Tibbitt, who also acted as the showrunner. In 2011, SpongeBob's Runaway Roadtrip, an anthology series consisting of five episodes from the season, was launched.

The show itself received several recognitions, including the 2011 and 2012 Kids' Choice Awards for Favorite Cartoon. The series was also nominated in various international Kids' Choice Awards ceremonies for the same category. At the 39th Daytime Emmy Awards the show received four nominations—including Outstanding Children's Animated Program, Outstanding Directing in an Animated Program, Outstanding Performer in an Animated Program for Rodger Bumpass as Squidward Tentacles, and Outstanding Sound Editing -Animation. At the 40th Daytime Emmy Awards, the series was nominated for Outstanding Achievement in Sound Editing - Animation. The show won the BAFTA Children's Awards for the International category. The episode "It's a SpongeBob Christmas!" was well received at the 40th Annie Awards, being nominated for three categories, including a successful win for Dan Driscoll for the Character Animation in an Animated Television or other Broadcast Venue Production category. In 2012, it was reported that the show was receiving a decline in ratings. The Wall Street Journal pointed to a few possible problems: It could be too old, or it may be shown on TV too often. Another issue could be its licensing to Netflix, an on-demand Internet streaming media, the previous year. As a result, Netflix CEO Reed Hastings announced not to renew their existing deal with Viacom, owner of the SpongeBob trademark. Since then, Viacom's deal with Netflix expired, removed its shows such as SpongeBob, and Dora the Explorer, and moved its programmings to Amazon.com, Netflix's top competitor, and later CBS All Access.

Several compilation DVDs that contained episodes from the season were released. The SpongeBob SquarePants: The Complete Eighth Season DVD was released in region 1 on March 12, 2013, region 2 on October 28, 2013, and region 4 on October 30, 2013.

Production
The season's executive producers were series creator Stephen Hillenburg and Paul Tibbitt, who also acted as the series' showrunner. Due to the success of the show, the New York Daily News reported that Nickelodeon picked up SpongeBob SquarePants for an eighth season on December 14, 2009, during the year which the show was celebrating its tenth anniversary on television. Brown Johnson, president of animation for Nickelodeon and MTVN Kids & Family Group, announced the renewal of the series. The season was ordered with 26 episodes, that would bring the total number of episodes for the series to 178. With its episode count of 178, SpongeBob SquarePants surpassed Rugrats in episodes, it became the sixth Nickelodeon series with most episodes. Johnson said "After a decade on our air, SpongeBob has emerged as one of the most beloved and popular characters in television history. Audiences of all ages have fallen in love with this show and we're delighted to be serving up additional original episodes to our viewers for many years."

Nickelodeon President Cyma Zarghami said "There are a bunch of different theories about SpongeBob. You can't dismiss the fact that it is a creatively excellent property. It's a character of good, positive energy. It came at a time when people wanted something more positive." On March 26, 2011, the season premiered with the "A Friendly Game" and "Oral Report". "A Friendly Game" was written by Casey Alexander, Zeus Cervas and Steven Banks, with Tom Yasumi serving as animation director. "Oral Report" was written by Alexander, Cervas and Dani Michaeli, and the animation was directed by Alan Smart.

Animation was handled overseas in South Korea at Rough Draft Studios. In 2012, Nickelodeon produced and debuted "It's a SpongeBob Christmas!", the first full-length episode of the series that was produced in stop motion animation. Mark Caballero, Seamus Walsh, and Christopher Finnegan of Screen Novelties animated it, and Caballero and Walsh also served as its directors. Production on the episode began in October 2011 at Los Angeles, California. According to Finnegan, it took about five months to shoot, with a couple of months on either end for research and development and post. Animation directors credited with episodes in the eighth season included Caballero, Andrew Overtoom, Alan Smart, Walsh, and Tom Yasumi. Episodes were written by a team of writers, which consisted of Alexander, Banks, Luke Brookshier, Nate Cash, Marc Ceccarelli, Cervas, Sean Charmatz, Andrew Goodman, Derek Iversen, Mr. Lawrence, Michaeli, Richard Pursel, Aaron Springer, Paul Tibbitt, and Vincent Waller. The season was storyboarded by Alexander, Brookshier, Cash, Ceccarelli, Cervas, Charmatz, Springer, and Waller. This is the last season to be produced in standard definition.

Cast
The eighth season featured Tom Kenny as the voice of the title character SpongeBob SquarePants and his pet snail Gary. SpongeBob's best friend, a starfish named Patrick Star, was voiced by Bill Fagerbakke, while Rodger Bumpass played the voice of Squidward Tentacles, an arrogant and ill-tempered octopus. Other members of the cast were Clancy Brown as Mr. Krabs, a miserly crab obsessed with money who is SpongeBob's boss at the Krusty Krab; Mr. Lawrence as Plankton, a small green copepod and Mr. Krabs' business rival; Jill Talley as Karen, Plankton's sentient computer sidekick; Carolyn Lawrence as Sandy Cheeks, a squirrel from Texas; Mary Jo Catlett as Mrs. Puff, SpongeBob's boating school teacher; and Lori Alan as Pearl, a teenage whale who is Mr. Krabs' daughter.

In addition to the regular cast members, episodes feature guest voices from many ranges of professions, including actors, musicians, and artists. For instance, in the episode "Ghoul Fools", American actor and comedian Chris Elliott guest starred in the episode as Lord Poltergeist, ghost pirate who runs a "haunted house boat." Ernest Borgnine and Tim Conway returned in the episode "Mermaid Man Begins", reprising their roles as SpongeBob and Patrick's favorite superheroes, Mermaid Man and Barnacle Boy, respectively. They reappeared in "Super Evil Aquatic Villain Team Up is Go!", voicing their respective roles. In "Pet Sitter Pat", Marion Ross voiced her recurring role as Grandma SquarePants, SpongeBob's grandmother. The episode "Pet Sitter Pat" was Marion Ross' last voice-over work for the series as she had officially retired from acting in 2018. Brian Doyle-Murray reprised his role as the Flying Dutchman for "Ghoul Fools". In "The Way of the Sponge", comedian Rich Fulcher guest starred as Fuzzy Acorns, Sandy's karate instructor. John Goodman guest starred in the special episode "It's a SpongeBob Christmas!" as Santa Claus. In "Hello Bikini Bottom", Andy Samberg voiced the character of Colonel Carper, a concert manager who wants to become SpongeBob and Squidward's band manager. Samberg said "I've been a SpongeBob fan for years, so I was honored to be asked. It's one of the few shows ever that's just as funny for kids as it is for adults."

Reception

Ratings
During its peak years in early 2000, SpongeBob SquarePants received enormous ratings and number of viewers. By 2012, it was reported that the series' ratings were declining. The average number of viewers aged 2 to 11 watching SpongeBob at any given time dropped 29% in the first quarter from a year earlier, according to Nielsen. Wall Street Journal business writer John Jannarone suggested that the age of the series and oversaturation of the show might be contributing to the decline of the series' ratings, and might also be directly responsible for the decline in Nickelodeon's overall ratings. Media analyst Todd Juenger, directly attributes the decline in Nickelodeon's ratings to the availability of streaming video content on services like Netflix, a provider of on-demand Internet streaming media. Philippe Dauman, the president and CEO of Viacom, contradicted the notion saying he did not think "the limited amount of Nick library content on Netflix [...] has had a significant impact". A Nickelodeon spokesman says SpongeBob is performing consistently well and remains as the number one rated animated series in all of children's television. He added "there is nothing that we have seen that points to SpongeBob as a problem." Dauman blamed the drop on "some ratings systemic issues" at Nielsen, citing extensive set-top-box data that "does in no way reflect" the Nielsen data.

Juenger also notes that SpongeBob could affect the ratings of other Nickelodeon programming because children often change channels to find their favorite program, then stay tuned into that network. Nickelodeon recently reduced its exposure in television. In the first quarter of 2012, the network cut back on the number of episodes it aired by 16% compared with a year earlier.

On April 22, 2013, Netflix CEO Reed Hastings announced their intentions not to renew their existing deal with Viacom. Since then, Viacom's deal with Netflix expired, and shows such as SpongeBob and Dora the Explorer were removed. However, SpongeBob is still available to stream on Netflix in Canada. On June 4, 2013, Viacom announced a multi-year licensing agreement which would move its programs, such as SpongeBob and Dora the Explorer, to Amazon.com, Netflix's top competitor. Amazon agreed to pay more than $200 million to Viacom for the license, its largest subscription streaming transaction ever.

Reviews and accolades
At the 39th Annie Awards, Dani Michaeli, Sean Charmatz, Nate Cash, Luke Brookshier and Paul Tibbitt were nominated for Best Writing in an Animated Television Production for the episode "Patrick's Staycation". Moreover, directors Mark Caballero and Seamus Walsh also received a nomination at the 40th Annie Awards for Directing in an Animated Television or other Broadcast Venue Production for the episode "It's a SpongeBob Christmas!". Nominated for the same episode, Dan Driscoll won the Character Animation in an Animated Television or other Broadcast Venue Production category. Savelen Forrest received the same nomination for his work on the episode, but lost. The episode was also nominated at the 2013 Golden Reel Awards for Best Sound Editing - Sound Effects, Foley, Dialogue and ADR Animation in Television. "It's a SpongeBob Christmas!" was nominated at the Annecy International Animated Film Festival for Special Award for a TV Series.

The show itself received several recognition. At the 39th Daytime Emmy Awards the show received four nominations—including Outstanding Children's Animated Program, Outstanding Directing in an Animated Program, Outstanding Performer in an Animated Program for Rodger Bumpass as Squidward Tentacles, and Outstanding Sound Editing - Animation. At the 40th Daytime Emmy Awards, the series was nominated for Outstanding Achievement in Sound Editing - Animation. The show was nominated at the Producers Guild of America for the Children's Program category. At the BAFTA Children's Awards, the show won the International category. At the 2011 and 2012 ASCAP Film and Television Awards, SpongeBob SquarePants won the Top Television Series category. Furthermore, at the 2011 Kids' Choice Awards, the show won the Favorite Cartoon category. The series also won the succeeding year's Kids' Choice Awards and the 2011 Indonesia Kids' Choice Awards for the same category. SpongeBob SquarePants also received Favorite Cartoon nominations at the Kids' Choice Awards Argentina 2011 and 2012, and at the 2012 Kids' Choice Awards Mexico. At the TP de Oro, the show won the Best Children and Youth Program category.

The season received positive reviews from media critics. In his review for The Boston Globe, Tom Russo was positive on the season DVD set. Russo praised the episode that "topped the shortlist", "Plankton's Good Eye", writing "the micro-antagonist clones one of SpongeBob's eyeballs for himself, and suddenly develops a more bubbly worldview." Author Richard Reitsma cited a scene in "Squidward's School for Grown-Ups", in which SpongeBob tries to win back Patrick's friendship by dressing as the operatic Brünnhilde (just as Bugs Bunny did in the classic 1957 cartoon What's Opera, Doc?), as an example of the supposed gay subtext in the series, claimed to exist by some critics of the show and denied by its creator.

Episodes

The episodes are ordered below according to Nickelodeon's packaging order, and not their original production or broadcast order.

DVD release
The DVD boxset for season eight was released by Paramount Home Entertainment and Nickelodeon in the United States and Canada on March 12, 2013, three months after the season had completed broadcast on television. The DVD release features bonus materials, including the animated short "Sandy's Vacation in Ruins."

Notes

References

External links

Season 8 at Metacritic

2011 American television seasons
2012 American television seasons
SpongeBob SquarePants seasons